The Dutch National Badminton Championships is a tournament organized to crown the best badminton players in the Netherlands.

The tournament started in 1932 and is held every year by Badminton Nederland.

Past winners

External links
EuroBadminton: Netherlands National Championships

Badminton tournaments in the Netherlands
National badminton championships
National championships in the Netherlands
Recurring sporting events established in 1932
1932 establishments in the Netherlands